The Kenya Army is the land arm of the Kenya Defence Forces.

History
The origin of the present day Kenya Army lie with the British Army's King's African Rifles. In the last quarter of the 19th Century the British began actively enforcing the abolition of the slave trade in East Africa. During the same period other European nations were also developing spheres of influence in Africa. The British established the Imperial British East Africa Company to take care of its interests. As these interests developed and expanded, there was need to create a more formidable force to safeguard these interests and expansion, and thus the first British land forces in Kenya were created.

In June 1873 the Sultan of Zanzibar, Barghash bin Said of Zanzibar, signed the final treaty to abolish slave trade throughout his territories. Enforcing the abolition became the task of the Royal Navy; within three weeks Admiral Arthur Cumming, Commander-in-Chief, East Indies, arrived at Zanzibar. In 1877 a Royal Navy officer, Lieutenant Lloyd Matthews, serving on  formed a small force of 300 Zanzibaris to combat the slave trade. In 1878 Lieutenant Matthews was given leave to serve under the Sultan who appointed him Brigadier General in command of the newly established force. By 1880 the force had grown to 1300 men who were all armed with Snider rifles donated to the Sultan by the British Government.

On 8 September 1888 the Imperial British East Africa Company was granted a royal charter and was charged with the responsibility of administering British East Africa on the lines of a Crown colony. In 1893 the three-year contract with the Indian contingent came to an end. During the same period the company was experiencing serious financial problems that had led to the abandonment of Uganda and Jubaland in fact, the company could barely police the coast. The then British Consul in Zanzibar, Sir Arthur Hardinge, notified the Foreign Office of his intention of taking over East Africa from the company. The British government accepted. On 1 July 1895 a British protectorate was declared over all the areas previously administered by the company. The company troops were subsequently reorganized under Captain Hatch.

In August 1895 the British government sanctioned the establishment of a force composed of 300 Punjabi, 300 Swahili, 100 Sudanese, and 200 soldiers from various ethnic groups in the region. This force was renamed the East African Rifles and was formed from the former Imperial British East Africa Company force in Mombasa (Fort Jesus).

Before the Second World War, British colonial forces in Kenya, the now-King's African Rifles, in the main, were small:
There was no conscription and the army was extremely selective, recruiting soldiers from ethnic groups with supposedly inherent military qualities, the so-called "martial races." In the 1920s and 1930s, martial races included the Kamba, Kalenjin, and Somali, pastoral semi-pastoral groups from impoverished regions. In contrast, Kikuyu and Meru of central Kenya were hardly found in the army. The Second World War brought a massive expansion of military personnel. From an interwar strength of less than 1,000 men, the armed forces increased to 75,000 by 1943. Thus, every tenth adult man was serving in the military, representing about 20 percent of the wage labor force. The huge demand for able-bodied and skilled men was met by extending the recruitment pool to communities the British did not consider martial. Additionally, the military offered wages above civilian levels. In 1941 the pay ranged between 17 and 60 shillings per month for a newly trained private in the East African Military Labour Service and East African Army Service Corps respectively, whereas civil wages for unskilled labor averaged between 8 and 12 shillings.22 The military offered additional pulls such as uniforms, housing, food, professional training, and promotion.

As part of the King's African Rifles, indigenous soldiers from Kenya Colony fought in several campaigns during World War II. They fought against the Italians in Italian East Africa during the East African Campaign, against the Vichy French in Madagascar during the Battle of Madagascar, and against the Japanese in Burma during the Burma Campaign. Initially, the KAR was deployed as the 1st East African Infantry Brigade and the 2nd East African Infantry Brigade. The first brigade was responsible for coastal defence and the second for the defence of the interior. By the end of July 1940, two additional East African brigades were formed, the 3rd East African Infantry Brigade and the 6th East African Infantry Brigade. Initially a Coastal Division and a Northern Frontier District Division were planned, but, instead, the 11th African Division and the 12th African Division was formed.

The two divisions included East African, Ghanaian, Nigerian, and South African troops. A Nigerian brigade, together with two East African brigades (the King's African Rifles brigades) and some South Africans, formed the 11th African Division. The 12th African Division was similarly formed, but with the Ghanaian brigade instead of the Nigerian brigade. The 11th African Division was disbanded in November 1941 and the 12th African Division was disbanded in April 1943. In 1943, the 11th (East Africa) Division was formed and it fought in Burma. In addition, two independent infantry brigades were sent from East Africa to India for service in Burma. The 22 (East Africa) Infantry Brigade served in the Arakan under command of XV Indian Corps, while the 28th (East Africa) Infantry Brigade served under IV Corps, playing a crucial role in the crossing of the Irrawaddy River.

Mau Mau Uprising and independence 
The KAR fought against the Mau Mau rebels under the command of British officers in the 1950s and on the side of loyalist Kenyans and those who advocated a peaceful transition to independence, such as Jomo Kenyatta. KAR battalions listed included 3 KAR (Kenya), 4 KAR (Uganda), 5 KAR (Kenya), 6 KAR (Tanganiyka), 7 & 23 KARs (Kenya), 26 KAR (Tanganyika).

As stipulated in the Kenya Military Forces (Naming of Units) Order 1964, 3 Battalion KAR, 5 Battalion KAR, 11 Battalion KAR, three attached training companies, Headquarters 70th (East African) Infantry Brigade, 1 Signal Squadron, 91 General Transport Company, workshops, and a variety of other Combat service support units were handed over to the new Kenya Army during the process of independence for Kenya in December 1963 and January 1964.

Kenyan authorities quickly began considering a parachute capability. "On October 14, 1964, the first batch of 40.. were sent to Britain for Parachute Basic Training course" at RAF Abingdon. Similar numbers ..followed until about 200 Kenyan troops qualified to form the 1st Independent Parachute Company on April 24, 1965."

In 1977 (probably during the Ogaden War) a Somali force crossed the border into northern Kenya. The same year Kenya placed an order with Vickers Defence Systems in the UK for 38 Vickers Main Battle Tank Mark 3 main battle tanks plus three armoured recovery vehicles (ARVs) which were all delivered by 1980, forming Kenya's initial tank battalion. Another order was placed in December 1980 for a further 38 Mark 3s, plus four ARVs, which were all completed at the works, if not delivered, by December 1982.

After Kenya invaded Somalia in Operation Linda Nchi in 2011, 6 Brigade became "fully fledged" in 2012. 6 Brigade was installed on the outskirts of Garissa town after Modika Barracks there was "launched" by President Uhuru Kenyatta on Friday 13 December 2019. Also moved there from Embakasi in Nairobi was 17 Kenya Rifles ("One Seven"). The other battalions of the brigade were 19 KR at Nyali Barracks just north of Mombasa and 21 KR at Mariakani Barracks.

By 2021, the International Institute for Strategic Studies listed 31 Type-92 wheeled armoured personnel carriers and 105 South African PUMA M26-15 Protected patrol vehicles in service.

On 1 May 2021, The Nation wrote that about 1,600 Army troops drawn from 20th Para, 30 Special Forces, and the Long Range Surveillance unit of the Directorate of Military Intelligence, would be dispatched to serve with MONUSCO [in the Democratic Republic of the Congo], with second rotation replacements coming from "the American-trained 40 Rangers Strike Force (40RSF), the Special Boat unit of the Kenya Navy and the Clearance Diving Unit," while the "newly formed Marine Commandos" also expected to be sent at some point. Congolese President Tshisekedi said “Kenya will voluntarily be part of the Rapid Intervention Brigade." The Kenyan contingent was "expected to replace South African troops.. and will be working alongside soldiers from Nepal." "A majority of the Kenyan soldiers will be part of MONUSCO."

Peacekeeping missions 
The Kenya Army has participated and continues to participate in international peacekeeping, Peace Support Operations. These activities were first considered in 1973 when the United Nations requested Kenya to contribute forces to UNEF II which was to separate Israel and the Arab states after the October War. Though Kenya acceded to the UN request, the troops were not deployed.

The first participation of the Kenya Army in Peace Support Operations was in 1979, when the Commonwealth requested the Republic of Kenya to contribute troops for the Commonwealth Monitoring Force in Rhodesia (now Zimbabwe). The Monitoring Force supervised the arrival and cantonment of the rebel Zimbabwe African National Liberation Army and Zimbabwe People's Revolutionary Army (ZIPRA) forces, and included 51 Kenya Army personnel under Colonel Jack Munyao who ran one of the 14 Assembly Points.

Subsequently, the Kenya Army contributed officers towards peace support operations in Chad in 1982 on the request of the Organization of African Unity. In 1989 the Army sent military observers and an infantry battalion to Namibia. Kenya has ranked number 6 out of the 90 countries who contribute military and civilian police to the UN operations.

Since 1989, Kenya has contributed military observers, staff officers, civilian police monitors, and infantry troops to various missions. The level of participation has also included force commanders, chief military observers, and chiefs of staff to the following UN and African Union missions:

United Nations Observer Mission in Liberia (Liberia) – Chief Military Observer
United Nations Mission in Liberia - Major General Leonard Ngondi was appointed Force Commander in December 2012.
ONUMOZ in Mozambique – Chief Military Observer
United Nations Transitional Assistance Group in Namibia – then Brigadier Daniel Ishmael Opande was appointed Deputy Force Commander
United Nations Protection Force (UNPROFOR) in the Federal Republic of Yugoslavia – Chief Military Observer
UNMOP (Croatia) – Chief Military Observer
AMISOM (Somalia)

To date, Kenyan United Nations peacekeepers have served in 16 different countries in Africa, the Middle East, the Balkans, and Asia. The period of deployment of the personnel has varied from mission to mission, in accordance with the complexities of each conflict situation. Missions have ranged from one to eight years.

Commanders of the Kenya Army

Lt. General Njiru was promoted and appointed the Kenya Army Commander. He was sworn in on July 27, 2022 at State House Nairobi. He was ADC for the late President Mwai Kibaki then partly ADC with the current President Uhuru Kenyatta whose term comes to an end this

Structure 
The Kenya Army is made up of various formations and services. These formations and services are divided between  two operational commands, the Western Command (WestCom) headquartered in Lanet and Eastern Command (EastCom) based at Embakasi Garrison. The Eastern Command was established in 1997 and its role is to defend the Eastern region of Kenya against external and internal threats. These areas include the capital itself and the former Central, Eastern, North Eastern and Coast provinces. Western Command is tasked with defending the Western region of the country and includes the former Rift Valley, Western and Nyanza provinces. In recent times there have been plans to set up a Nairobi Metropolitan Command for the capital and the surrounding metropolitan area of Machakos County, Kiambu County and Kajiado County. This realignment would have Eastern Command relocated to Garissa but it remains unclear whether the mooted plan was implemented.

Kenya Army Formations
2 Brigade
3rd Battalion, Kenya Rifles. This is Kenya's oldest unit which dates back to the 1880s. They are based in Lanet, Nakuru. Their Colour is red and their motto is 'Red Scarlets'
5th Kenya Rifles. Based in Gilgil, their colour is Dark Blue. Their unit motto is 'Fighting Five'
9 Kenya Rifles - Moi Barracks, Eldoret. Their colour is Orange. Their unit motto is 'Orangers fire and war machines'. Winner of end-year foot and drill competition 2020.
21 Transport Company
22 Field Workshop
23 Ordnance Company
4 Brigade
1st Battalion, Kenya Rifles. Based in Nanyuki, Their motto is 'Green Fire' and their colour is Green.
7 Kenya Rifles - Langata Barracks, Nairobi. Their colour is Maroon and their unit motto is 'Maroon Commandos' and 'Man to man I am the best'
15th Kenya Rifles. Formed in the early 1990s. It has been based in the coastal region of the country. currently housed at Mariakani Barracks. Their colour is Blue and the unit motto is 'Stay High'.
41 Transport Company
42 Field Workshop
43 Ordnance Company
6 Brigade - formed by 2010 - relocated from Embakasi to Modika Barracks, Garissa.
17 Kenya Rifles - Formed in 2011 and in late 2018 stationed at Modika. They are known as the 'Desert Rangers' and their colour is purple. They initially used desert brown as their colour, which was changed to new, purple colours during the 2018 Jamhuri Day ceremonies.
19 Kenya Rifles - Nyali Barracks. Also known as the 'Ash Warriors'. Their unit colour is Ash Grey and formally received their Presidential and Regimental Colours during the 2021 Jamhuri Day ceremonies at Uhuru Gardens.
21 Kenya Rifles - Mariakani Barracks but they will soon move to Manda Bay in Lamu to join the Kenya Navy in proving security in that area and especially Boni Forest.
61 Transport Company
62 Field Workshop
63 Ordnance Company
8 Brigade (current Brigade Commander is Brigadier David Chesire.)
23 Mechanised Infantry Battalion (23 MIB) who formally received their Presidential and regimental colours during the 2022 Jamhuri Day celebrations at Nyayo National Stadium.
25 MIB (Mechanised Infantry Battalion)
27 MIB (Mechanised Infantry Battalion)
110 Brigade
112 Brigade
Army Special Operations Brigade (Kenya) - in 2020 under the command of Colonel John Njeru
20 Parachute Battalion
30 Special Forces Battalion
40 Ranger Strike Force Battalion
Special Operations Training School (SOTS)
Kenya Army Artillery Brigade
66 Artillery Battalion
75 Artillery Battalion (Air Defence)
77 Artillery Battalion
88 Artillery Battalion
School of Artillery
Kenya Army Armoured Brigade
76 Armoured Recce Battalion (ARB)
78 Tank Battalion
81 Tank Battalion
86 Armoured Recce Battalion (ARB)
91 Tank Battalion
School Of Armour
Kenya Army Engineers Brigade
10 Engineers Battalion
12 Engineers Battalion
School of Combat Engineering (SOCE)
Kenya Army Corps of Signals (KACS)
AHQ Signal Battalion
School of Signals
1st Canine-K9 Regiment
Directorate of Military Intelligence (Kenya)
Military Intelligence Corps
Long Range Surveillance Group
School of Military Intelligence
Joint Helicopter Command (Kenya) - replaced the disbanded 50 Air Cavalry Battalion

Kenya Army services 
Kenya Army Ordnance Corps
Defence Forces Ordnance Depot (DFOD)
2nd Ordnance Battalion
School of Ordnance (SOO)
Kenya Army Corps of Transport (KACT)
Transport Battalion
Heavy Lift Battalion
School of Transport (SOT)
Kenya Army Corps of Electrical and Mechanical Engineering (KACEME)
This Corps mainly deals with maintenance of motor and mechanical equipment that is used in the Kenya Army. It is based at Kahawa Garrison along Thika Road.
Workshop Battalion
School of Electrical and Mechanical Engineering (SEME)
Military Police Corps (MPC) - based at the Defence Headquarters along Lenana Road Nairobi
1 MP battalion
2 MP battalion
School of Military Police (SOMP)
Kenya Army Medical Corps (KAMC)
Medical Battalion
Kenya Army Corps of Education (KACE)
Defence Forces Constabulary (DFC)
Strategic Communications (STRATCOMM)

Equipment 
The acquisition of T-72s has caused significant controversy. Thirty-three vehicles ordered from Ukraine were hijacked by Somali pirates. The Ukrainian Defence Minister Yury Yekhanurov confirmed 33 Russian T-72 tanks and "a substantial quantity of ammunition" were aboard the captured cargo ship, called the Faina". The ship they were being carried in, MV Faina was released and the tanks unloaded in the port city of Mombasa in February 2009. There have been doubts expressed as to whether the T-72s imported by Kenya are intended for use by the Kenyan Army. Instead, popular opinion is that they were being clandestinely imported for the South Sudanese army, which has an arms embargo against it.

The KDF attempted to dispel speculation by publicly showing these tanks (and other hardware) as part of its arsenal on 22 August 2010, during rehearsals for the passing of the new Constitution of Kenya. Nevertheless, a cloud of doubt hangs over the intent of the tank acquisition. The United States diplomatic cables leak indicated that an ongoing process of armaments purchases on behalf of the Southern Sudanese government by the Kenyan government was "a badly kept secret." The leaks go on to speculate that these clandestine operations were motivated by the Kenya political leadership's desire to support Southern Sudan, but not in a way that would openly provoke Khartoum or potentially threaten South Sudan's eventual independence.

The KDF is interested in the US Army-approved version of the Multiple Integrated Laser Engagement System (MILES) combat simulation system.

Small arms

Anti-tank weapons

Armoured fighting vehicles

Armoured engineering vehicles

Utility vehicles

Artillery

Aircraft

Ranks and Insignia

Officers
//*/*

Enlisted personnel

Notes

Further reading 
'Operation Linda Nchi: Kenya's Military Experience in Somalia,' 2014.

 
Ken
Government agencies of Kenya